Palitha Kumara Thewarapperuma (born 3 May 1960) is a Sri Lankan politician, a former member of the Parliament of Sri Lanka. He belongs to the United National Party . He was given the position of Deputy Minister of Internal Affairs, Wayamba Development and Cultural Affairs in the United National Party led national government in 2015.

Controversies and Incidents 
Was suspended from parliament for a week in 2016 for a brawl. Was part of the brawl on 15 Nov 2018, and had a blunt knife in hand which he appeared to want to use but held back by fellow UNP MPs.

In July 2016, Palitha Theewarapperuma went on hunger strike demanding authorities to admit 9 children in to a public school. During the events he attempted suicide by hanging himself. However he was admitted to the hospital and underwent a bypass surgery. Following the incident the students were admitted to grade 1 of the school. 

During the 2020 COVID-19 pandemic he on several occasions he distributed food supplies to the people of the village Atalugama, which was under lock down due to COVID infections.

Social Services and Public Image
Palitha Thewarapperuma has been popular amongst the local masses for his social service activities and philanthropy. He rose to fame among people of the entire island especially during the COVID-19 pandemic in Sri Lanka for having provided food, dry rations and other necessities to the rural population of constituency the Kalutara Electoral District.

Family 
His son died of a sudden illness in August 2015.

References

Members of the 14th Parliament of Sri Lanka
Members of the 15th Parliament of Sri Lanka
United National Party politicians
1960 births
Living people
Sri Lankan Buddhists
Sinhalese politicians